Ma Su Chen aka Rebel Boxer or Bloody Struggle  is a 1972 Hong Kong film directed and co-written by Ting Shan-hsi who also directed and wrote the film Furious Slaughter 1972. It is a martial arts film that stars Nancy Yen, Jimmy Wang Yu, and Sally Chen. It's a sequel to Furious Slaughter 1972 in which Jimmy Wang Yu plays the lead role. It was released in Hong Kong on 14 June 1972 but in Taiwan on 30 May 1972.

Apparently, the cast mentioned in Rotten Tomatoes  is based on another version of Ma Su Chen (1972) because it listed two additional stars, Richard Harrison and Hwang Jang Lee,  not found in other cast list of the same movie.

Plot

Believing that her brother has been murdered, a martial artist Ma Su Chen (Nancy Yen) sets out to avenge him. Ma Su Chen is also a doctor. Later part of the movie, both of them fought together as a brother-sister team against their common enemy and defeated them.

Cast

References

External links
 Paul Bevan, The Adventures of Ma Suzhen. 'An Heroic Woman Takes Revenge in Shanghai' (Springer Link, 2021. ISBN 978-3-030-89035-3) - the first English translation of The Adventures of Ma Suzhen (published in Shanghai, 1920), with an essay contextualising the story, and its multiple lives as a stage play, film and novel.

1972 films
Hong Kong martial arts films
1970s action films
1970s Mandarin-language films
Films directed by Ting Shan-hsi